Yassin ElShafei (born 16 June 2001 in Cairo) is an Egyptian professional squash player. As of October 2021, he was ranked number 149 in the world.

References

2001 births
Living people
Egyptian male squash players
21st-century Egyptian people